The law of New Hampshire is the state law of the U.S. state of New Hampshire. It consists of the Constitution of the State of New Hampshire, as well as the New Hampshire Revised Statutes Annotated, the New Hampshire Code of Administrative Rules, and precedents of the state courts.

Constitution

Revised Statutes Annotated

The Revised Statutes Annotated (RSA) are a work published by Thomson West and are a revision of the Revised Laws (RL) of 1942. Originally ratified in 1955, the RSA is a codification of general and public laws of the state.

Code of Administrative Rules

References

External links
Laws and Rules at-a-Glance, NH.gov
State of New Hampshire Revised Statutes online, GenCourt.state.nh.us
State Constitution, NH.gov

New Hampshire law
N